"Help! I'm a Fish (Little Yellow Fish)" is a song performed by Danish teen pop group Little Trees. The single released with the Danish movie Help! I'm a Fish. In Denmark, it was released as a single by fellow Danish teen pop duo Creamy. It was certified triple platinum in Scandinavia.

Composition
The song of a key is in E major and 130 beats per minute.

Track listing

Charts

Other versions 
 Fellow Danish girl group Creamy recorded a version of the song for their 2000 album, We Got the Time. Ole Evenrud also produced this version of the song, and so did Belgian group K3.
 The Flemish girl group K3 recorded a Dutch version of the song for the Dutch release of the movie. It was included on their 2001 album Tele-Romeo called "Blub, ik ben een vis".

References 

2001 debut singles
2000 songs